Microphysogobio microstomus is a species of cyprinid fish found in the lower reaches of the Yangtze in China.

References

Cyprinid fish of Asia
Freshwater fish of China
Fish described in 1995
Microphysogobio